The TE2 is a class of Soviet diesel-electric locomotives built by Malyshev Factory in Kharkiv, Ukraine, from 1948 to 1955. It is nominally a two-unit version of class TE1 but is very different in appearance. While the TE1 is a Co-Co hood unit, the TE2 is a Bo-Bo+Bo-Bo cab unit.

Powertrain
Each of the two units is powered by a  Penza D50 4-stroke 6 cylinder supercharged diesel engine and has four  DC traction motors.

Production
Prototypes were built in 1948 and 1949 and series production ran from 1950 to 1955. A total of 528 pairs was built. Each pair carried a single number in the range 001 to 528.

Preservation
A TE2-414 is preserved at the Museum of Railway Technology, Saint Petersburg.

TE4
The TE4 was an experimental modification of a TE2, designed to run on solid fuel by using a producer gas system. The gas generator was mounted on a four-axle non-powered unit, placed between the TE2 power units, making a wheel arrangement of Bo-Bo+2-2+Bo-Bo. It was not a success and was converted back to a TE2. See ТЭ4 at the Russian-language Wikipedia.

TE6
The TE6 was a class of sixteen TE2-type locomotives ordered by the Ministry of Defence in 1952. They were single-section and their purpose was to serve as locomotives or mobile alternating current generators. They were designed to "meet the requirements of protection against injury factors of a nuclear explosion". ТЭ6

References

 

Railway locomotives introduced in 1948
TE2
5 ft gauge locomotives